The New Ten Major Construction Projects refers to the construction plans in Taiwan introduced by then-premier Yu Shyi-kun in November 2003.

List of the projects 

 Top universities and research centers
 Goal: to have at least 15 major graduate schools ranked number 1 in Asia in 5 years; to get at least one college ranked one of the top 100 colleges of the world in 10 years.
 International arts and popular music centers
 Northern Taiwan: Greater Taipei New Theater
 Central Taiwan: Taichung Metropolitan Opera House
 Southern Taiwan: Kaohsiung National Arts Cultural Center (to be called the Wei Wu Ying Cultural Center)
 M-Taiwan plan
 Goal: to build a world-class internet service environment, and become the third trillion-dollar communication industrial development.
 Taiwan exhibition
 Goal: to exhibit Taiwan's creativity and vigor, and prompt the development of technology, tourism, and culture.
 TRA MRTizion: Appealing for pass car of THSR, via additions of stations, train services, elevation, underground passages, make TRA transform to metro area and regional MRTs, let TRA transform and renewal, and lead to urban renewal along the line.
 Freeway constructions
 Goal: to develop tourist attraction areas such as Yilan, Hualien, Taitung, and Nantou; to facilitate the everyday life circle; to expand the highway network.
 Kaohsiung Harbor intercontinental container port center
 Goal: to construct a new intercontinental container port for 15,000 TEU container ships; improve the transport ability of the Kaohsiung port.
 Northern, central, and southern metro system
 Goal: to plan and construct a total of 182 km of metro routes; to improve the rapid transit systems in metropolitan areas of northern, central, and southern Taiwan.
 Sewers
 Goal: to improve the living environment; to purify the water; to regain beautiful rivers and ocean.
 Turn seawater to drinking water; shut down other dams on the mountains. Solve the famine problems, make more tap water, create tourism and environmental friendly lakes.

See also
 Ten Major Construction Projects
 History of Taiwan

References
 R.O.C.'s Government Information Office: The Ten New Major Construction Projects

Economy of Taiwan